Doña Flor y sus dos maridos, is a Mexican telenovela produced by Eduardo Meza for Televisa that premiered on Las Estrellas on 25 March 2019 and ended on 21 June 2019. The show is based on the 1966 Brazilian novel of the same name written by Jorge Amado. Production began on 22 November 2018 in Mexico City, and it stars Ana Serradilla, Sergio Mur, and Joaquín Ferreira.

Plot 
Flor Méndez has always felt different to all the women she knows and it is that her passionate temperament and independent spirit, sometimes does not go with the limited horizons of the town where she was born. Flor's greatest passion is dancing, despite Margarita, who forbade it, since the death of Narciso, Flor's father. Margarita blames Flor for this death, although the reality is different. Flor seems resigned and works as a receptionist in the dance academy of the town, but also continues to dance, in secret. Her dream opportunity comes when she is invited to audition for a major company in Mexico City. Flor decides to pursue her dream and this causes a conflict with Margarita, which leads her to leave town. During the party of Tlaxcalixtlahuacaca, Flor dances with the group of the academy, in front of all the town. At the party Valentín Hernández approaches and dances with her, the connection between both is instantaneous. Valentín is a "Robin Hood" type swindler, rogue and seductive, with great sensual appeal. Valentín arrives in town with his friend, El Chile. They are fleeing from Cassandra, Valentín's former lover and partner. His arrival will not only disrupt Flor's life, but also of the entire town.

The attraction between Flor and Valentín is very strong, only that she is determined to succeed and travels to Mexico City. Valentín follows her, willing to support her and she accepts it. Meanwhile, another man has been disappointed with the absence of Flor, Dr. Teodoro Hidalgo, her childhood friend, who days before, is rejected by Flor, by asking her to marry him. This causes Teodoro to decide to go to Spain to study a specialty. Flor auditions, but when she performs her test, she suffers a fall, the injury is irreversible and she is incapable of dancing professionally again. This circumstance unites her to Valentín and by mutual agreement they decide to marry, in order to pay for the surgery that Flor needs. The couple starts their life in the city and the attraction becomes a deep love. Later, they return to Tlaxcalixtlahuacaca, where Flor confronts not only her family, but the entire town, for being accustomed to judging all those who act differently. Soon, Valentín makes friends and enemies, such as Octavio and Samantha Mercader, owners of the casino.

Valentín's eagerness to give Flor everything she needs, causes him to get into trouble again, without his wife's knowledge. And when nobody expects it, Valentín dies from a heart attack on a night of partying. His death is a blow for Flor and everyone in town. Only, along with the sadness, they also discover the lies of Valentín. In the middle of all this, Teodoro reappears, who consoles Flor. What almost everyone ignores is that Valentín, turned into a ghost, will return to try to recover Flor's love and discover that she is married to Teodoro.

Cast

Main 
 Ana Serradilla as María Florencia "Flor" Méndez Canúl
 Sergio Mur as Teodoro "Teo" Hidalgo Flores
 Joaquín Ferreira as Valentín Hernández
 Mariluz Bermúdez as Samantha Cabrera de Serrano
 Rebecca Jones as Margarita Canúl
 Alejandro Calva as Octavio Mercader Serrano
 Roberto Blandón as Óscar Hidalgo
 Carlos Corona as Padre Elpidio
 Ximena Ayala as Rosalía Méndez Canúl
 Liz Gallardo as Mariana Santos Cruz
 Ianis Guerrero as Aureliano Méndez Canúl
 Ricardo Polanco as Porfirio "El Chile" Habanero López
 Vicky Araico as Itzamara Bianchi Roldán
 Jorge Luis Vázquez as Joaquín Valderrábano Pech
 Alejandra Ley as Micaela Navarro Robles
 Fernando Robles as Nestor
 Luis Curiel as Sixto "Tito" Bianchi Roldán
 Ilse Ikeda as Elsa
 Elizabeth Guindi as Tere
 Gina Pedret as Jovita
 Talia Marcela as Carmen
 Cecilia Constantino as Gladys
 Rocío de Santiago as Páris
 Karla Esquivel as Lola
 Susana Jiménez as Gris
 Patricio José as Lalo
 Miranda Goncalves as Xóchitl Méndez Santos
 Alexander Tavizon as Diego
 Alfredo Huereca as Bendito
 Sol Madrigal as Cassandra
 Lorena del Castillo as Malba

Guest stars 
 Eugenio Cobo as Artemio
 Sylvia Pasquel as Carlota and Maximiliana
 Alberto Agnesi as Atahualpa

Ratings 
 
}}

Episodes 

Notes

References

External links 
 

2019 telenovelas
Mexican telenovelas
2019 Mexican television series debuts
2019 Mexican television series endings
Televisa telenovelas
Spanish-language telenovelas
Television shows based on Brazilian novels
Mexican LGBT-related television shows